The 2017–18 NJIT Highlanders men's basketball team represented the New Jersey Institute of Technology during the 2017–18 NCAA Division I men's basketball season. The Highlanders, led by second-year head coach Brian Kennedy, played their home games at the Wellness and Events Center in Newark, New Jersey as members of the Atlantic Sun Conference (ASUN). They finished the season 14–16, 7–7 in ASUN play to finish in a tie for fourth place. They lost in the quarterfinals of the ASUN tournament to North Florida.

The season marked the first season for the Wellness and Events Center, a $110 million athletic center on the school's campus.

Previous season
The Highlanders finished the 2016–17 season 11–20, 3–11 in ASUN play to finish in a tie for seventh place. They lost in the quarterfinals of the ASUN tournament to Lipscomb.

Offseason

Departures

Incoming transfers

2017 recruiting class

Roster

Schedule and results

|-
!colspan=9 style=| Non-conference regular season

|-
!colspan=9 style=| Atlantic Sun Conference regular season

|-
!colspan=9 style=| Atlantic Sun tournament

Source

References

NJIT Highlanders men's basketball seasons
Njit